Mudan District is an urban district of Heze, Shandong province. It is the seat of Heze's prefectural government and center of its built-up or metro area, bordering Henan province to the northwest across the Yellow River.

History
Southwest Mudan District was the site of the ancient and medieval town of Yuanqu, which was the seat of an eponymous county.

Administrative divisions
As 2012, this County is divided to 10 subdistricts, 12 towns and 2 townships.
Subdistricts

Towns

Townships
 Huji Township
 Huangzhen Township

References

External links
 Official site

County-level divisions of Shandong